Larry J. Melancon (August 7, 1955 – 25 March 2021) was an American jockey in Thoroughbred horse racing who rode primarily on the Kentucky-Arkansas circuit.

Melancon (pronounced Ma-lawn-son) was born in Breaux Bridge, Louisiana. He began racing horses at age nine at local bush tracks and at age sixteen obtained his jockeys license. He rode his first winner on September 28, 1971, at Jefferson Downs Race Track in the New Orleans suburb of Kenner, Louisiana. The following year he won one hundred and eighty two races, the most of any apprentice jockey in the United States.

During his long career, Larry Melancon won numerous Graded stakes races and of his four appearances in the Kentucky Derby, his top result was a fourth in the 1976 edition aboard Amano.

Melancon retired from riding in 2010 having won 2,857 races and more than $60 million in purses. He died in Louisville, Kentucky.

References

 Larry Melancon's biography at Oaklawn Park Race Track

1955 births
People from Breaux Bridge, Louisiana
American jockeys
Cajun jockeys
2021 deaths